Gaia Trafikk was the largest public transportation provider in Bergen and Os, Norway until it merged with HSD forming Tide.

Gaia was formed by the 1998 merger of Pan Trafikk, the bus company serving northern and southern Bergen, and Bergen Sporvei, the company serving Bergen's inner city. The route network covered most of Bergen, but the western suburbs were serviced by Hardanger Sunnhordlandske Dampskipsselskap (HSD). This resulted in a fixed fleet between the yellow buses of Bergen Sporvei and the red buses of Pan Trafikk being operated by the same company, and coordinated, making a more user-friendly bus system. The largest owners of Gaia was Bergen City Council (43.6%), HSB (7.9%), Yrkestrafikkforbundet (7.3%) and Os City Council (7.3%).

Among the fleet of about 300 buses are 8 trolleybuses (two of them are dual-mode buses), making Bergen the only city in north-west Europe to have them. Gaia fleet also contained 36 natural gas buses.

Gaia Trafikk is merged with HSD forming the company Tide. The general assembly at HSD approved the merger on 29 June 2006, while the approval at Gaia came on 17 July 2006. The new company is listed on the Oslo Stock Exchange. Both British Arriva and the Norwegian Nettbuss had announced a wish to buy Gaia, indicating a price around NOK 400 million.

References 

Companies based in Bergen
Defunct bus companies of Norway
Trolleybus transport in Norway
Bus companies of Vestland
Transport companies established in 1998
Transport companies disestablished in 2006
1998 establishments in Norway
2006 disestablishments in Norway